Ivan Gulev (born 12 December 1957) is a Bulgarian sports shooter. He competed in the men's trap event at the 1996 Summer Olympics.

References

External links
 

1957 births
Living people
Bulgarian male sport shooters
Olympic shooters of Bulgaria
Shooters at the 1996 Summer Olympics
People from Asenovgrad
20th-century Bulgarian people